The Greater Nile Oil Pipeline is an important oil export pipeline in Sudan. It was constructed by the Greater Nile Petroleum Operating Company (GNPOC) and commenced operation in 1999. It is operated by the China National Petroleum Corporation (CNPC) which is a 40% stakeholder in GNPOC.

Initially, the pipeline began at the Heglig oil field in South Kurdufan state. Since 1999, the pipeline has been extended and it now begins in the Unity oil field. The pipeline extends to the Port Sudan crude oil refinery on the Red Sea, via the Nuba Mountains and Khartoum.

See also 

 Economy of Sudan

References

Oil pipelines in Sudan
Oil pipelines in South Sudan
South Sudan–Sudan relations